Carmela Cipriani (born 11 November 1996) is an Italian professional racing cyclist, who most recently rode for UCI Women's Continental Team .

See also
 List of 2016 UCI Women's Teams and riders

References

External links
 

1996 births
Living people
Italian female cyclists
Place of birth missing (living people)
Sportspeople from Pescara
Cyclists from Abruzzo